Hot Dawg is an album by American musician David Grisman, released in 1978.

Track listing 
 "Dawg's Bull" (David Grisman) – 4:14
 "Devlin'" (Tony Rice) – 5:06
 "Minor Swing" (Stephane Grappelli, Django Reinhardt) – 3:36
 "Dawgology" (Grisman, Richard Greene) – 7:11
 "Neon Tetra" (Rice) – 6:29
 "Janice" (Grisman) – 3:57
 "Dawg-Ola" (Grisman) – 3:56
 "16/16" (Grisman) – 5:27

Chart positions

Personnel

David Grisman – mandolin
Tony Rice – guitar, + violin (#6)
Darol Anger – violin (#1,2,4,6,7), violectra (#5)
Mike Marshall – mandolin (#3,4,8)
Todd Phillips – bass (#1,5)
  
with
Eddie Gómez – bass (#3,4,8)
Stéphane Grappelli – violin (#3,8)
Buell Neidlinger – bass (#2,7)
Bill Amatneek – bass (#6)

Production notes:
David Grisman – producer
Bill Wolf – engineer, mixing, mastering
Bob Shumaker – engineer
Bob McLeod – mastering
Mark Hanauer – photography
Brian Davis – illustrations
Chuck Beeson – design
Roland Young – art direction

(#1,2,4-7) Recorded at His Masters Wheels Studio by Bill Wolf, 
(#3,8) Recorded of 1750 Arch Street Studios by Bob Shumaker

References

1978 albums
David Grisman albums
Tony Rice albums
Horizon Records albums